The canton of La Malepère à la Montagne Noire (before 2015: canton of Montréal) is an administrative division of the Aude department, southern France. Its borders were modified at the French canton reorganisation which came into effect in March 2015. Its seat is in Montréal.

Composition 

It consists of the following communes:

Alzonne
Arzens
Brousses-et-Villaret
Les Brunels
Carlipa
Caux-et-Sauzens
Cenne-Monestiés
Cuxac-Cabardès
Fontiers-Cabardès
Fraisse-Cabardès
Labécède-Lauragais
Lacombe
Laprade
Montolieu
Montréal
Moussoulens
Pezens
Raissac-sur-Lampy
Saint-Denis
Sainte-Eulalie
Saint-Martin-le-Vieil
Saissac
Verdun-en-Lauragais
Villemagne
Villeneuve-lès-Montréal
Villesèquelande
Villespy

Councillors

Pictures of the canton

References 

Cantons of Aude